Edward August Hennig (October 13, 1879 – August 28, 1960) was an American gymnast who competed in the 1904 Summer Olympics. He died in Summit County, Ohio.

Hennig won two gold medals, one of them at club swinging. In the horizontal bar event he and his countryman Anton Heida had the same score and the gold medal was shared between them.

He also competed in the pommel horse event without winning a medal. In the all-around event he finished 50th, in the team competition he was a member of the Turnverein Vorwärts (Cleveland) which finished 13th. In the gymnastics triathlon he finished 59th and in the athletics triathlon he finished 36th.

References

External links
U.S. Gymanastics and Honored Guests biography
databaseolympics.com profile

1879 births
1960 deaths
American male artistic gymnasts
Gymnasts at the 1904 Summer Olympics
Olympic gold medalists for the United States in gymnastics
Medalists at the 1904 Summer Olympics
20th-century American people